The 2012 International V8 Supercar Championship (often simplified to the 2012 V8 Supercars Championship) was an FIA-sanctioned international motor racing series for V8 Supercars. It was the fourteenth running of the V8 Supercar Championship Series and the sixteenth series in which V8 Supercars have contested the premier Australian touring car title. The championship began on 1 March at the Clipsal 500 and concluded on 2 December at the Homebush Street Circuit. The 53rd Australian Touring Car Championship title was awarded to the winner of the Drivers' Championship by the Confederation of Australian Motor Sport.

Jamie Whincup and Triple Eight Race Engineering started the season as the defending drivers' and teams' champions. At Winton, the penultimate event of the season, Whincup secured his defence of the Drivers Championship, with Triple Eight Race Engineering also wrapping up the Teams Championship. Whincup's teammate Craig Lowndes took second in the points standings from Mark Winterbottom, of Ford Performance Racing, at the final round of the series to give Triple Eight their second consecutive 1–2 finish in the Drivers Championship.

Calendar
The championship was contested over thirty races at fifteen events.
A provisional calendar was released on 8 October 2011.

Calendar changes
 The Yas V8 400 was moved from the first event of the championship to the first weekend of November, supporting the Abu Dhabi Formula One Grand Prix. It was changed to a three sprint-race format.
 The Falken Tasmania Challenge at Symmons Plains Raceway was moved from its November date to become the second event of the championship.
 Phillip Island and Sandown switched formats.  Phillip Island hosted a standalone race meeting in May, while Sandown returned to the 500 km endurance race format.  The Sandown 500 featured a revised qualifying format.
 The Queensland 300 was changed from the three-race structure which was used in 2011, returning to a more traditional two-race format.
 The Saturday races at Symmons Plains, Phillip Island, Winton and Queensland Raceway were extended by twenty kilometres.
 An additional international event was planned for the weekend of 11 November. At the 2012 Clipsal 500, V8 Supercars chairman Tony Cochrane said that the vacant place was "unlikely" to be filled by an Australian venue. On 22 April 2012, it was announced that an international location could not be secured for the November date, and the Winton event was moved to November to replace it. The Sydney Motorsport Park at Eastern Creek made a return to the calendar after a three-year absence to fill in Winton's original August date.

Teams and drivers

The following teams and drivers contested the 2012 championship.

Notes
 — For points-scoring purposes, Kelly Racing was recognised as two separate entities: "Jack Daniel's Racing", which is made up of car No. 7 and car #15; and "Kelly Racing", which consisted of cars No. 11 and No. 51.
 — The No. 23 wildcard entry was prepared by Dunlop Series team Minda Motorsport and operated by Kelly Racing.

Team and driver changes
 After leaving Walkinshaw Racing, Fabian Coulthard joined Brad Jones Racing.
 Jason Bargwanna left Brad Jones Racing and was unable to find a drive with another team.
 Alex Davison was unable to secure a full-time drive for the 2012 season, and returned to the Australian Carrera Cup Championship.
 Paul Dumbrell retired from full-time racing, joining Triple Eight Race Engineering as an endurance driver.
 Lee Holdsworth left Holden team Garry Rogers Motorsport in October 2011, signing a three-year contract with the Ford-backed Stone Brothers Racing.
 Russell Ingall moved from Paul Morris Motorsport to Walkinshaw Racing, replacing Fabian Coulthard.
 Dick Johnson Racing expanded to three cars with Dean Fiore moving his Triple F Racing franchise to become a satellite team within DJR. Under the terms of the arrangement, Fiore would continue to use the No. 12 from the Triple F REC with Jim Beam sponsoring he and Steven Johnson, while James Moffat would acquire Norton as major sponsor for the No. 18 car. DJR later announced a fourth car by securing a lease of a Paul Morris Motorsport owned Racing Entitlement Contract with Steve Owen being confirmed as the driver.
 Warren Luff left Lucas Dumbrell Motorsport, citing the team's uncertain future and unstable management as his reasons for leaving. The team later acquired an ex-Triple Eight Commodore from Paul Morris Motorsports. Luff was replaced by Taz Douglas.
 Former DTM, A1GP, Le Mans and Formula One test driver Alexandre Prémat joined Garry Rogers Motorsport, filling the seat left vacant by Lee Holdsworth.
 Karl Reindler joined Kelly Racing after two seasons with Britek Motorsport.
 David Reynolds left Kelly Racing. He later replaced Paul Dumbrell at Rod Nash Racing.
 David Wall joined Brad Jones Racing after competing with the team as an endurance co-driver during the 2011 season.
 Jonathon Webb's Tekno Autosports switched from running Ford Falcons to Holden Commodores. The team expanded to a two-car operation, leasing one of the Racing Entitlement Contracts owned by Paul Morris Motorsport. West Australian driver Michael Patrizi joined the team after driving in Carrera Cup in 2011.

Mid-season changes
 Greg Murphy was ruled out of the Symmons Plains round due to a back injury sustained in a collision during the 2012 Clipsal 500. Dunlop Series driver David Russell replaced him for the event. Two weeks before the event at Hidden Valley Raceway, Murphy suffered a relapse of his back injury and Kelly Racing announced that he would be forced to sit out until at least the Sandown 500 endurance race. David Russell was retained as Murphy's replacement for Hidden Valley, with  Formula One World Champion Jacques Villeneuve joining the team for Townsville, Queensland Raceway and Sydney Motorsport Park events.
 Todd Kelly was ruled out of the final four events of the 2012 season, after undergoing surgery for a shoulder injury sustained in a training accident. Kelly's endurance partner, Tim Blanchard, replaced him for the remainder of the season.
 Greg Ritter replaced Garry Rogers Motorsport's Alexandre Prémat for the Gold Coast 600.
 Scott McLaughlin replaced Alexandre Prémat for Race 30 in Sydney after Prémat had to be removed from his car suffering from dehydration during Race 29 the day before.

Results and standings

Results summary

Championship standings
Points system
Points were awarded to the driver or drivers of a car that had completed 75% of the race distance and was running at the completion of the final lap. Various different points scales were applied to events having one, two, or three, ensuring that a driver would be awarded 300 points for winning all races at any event.

Notes:
Two-race format: denotes all races except the Perth, Sandown, Bathurst, Surfers Paradise, and Abu Dhabi events.
Three-race format: the Trading Post Perth Challenge at Barbagallo Raceway and the Yas V8 200 at the Yas Marina Circuit consisted of three races rather than two. The total number of points on offer for each position remained the same as in other rounds, but were divided evenly across the three races.
Sandown: two drivers share one car for the main race. The first qualifying race was for non-regular co-drivers, while the regular championship drivers contested the second qualifying race. Points from each race were awarded to both drivers.
Bathurst: two drivers share one car for the race. The full points total was awarded to both drivers.
Surfers Paradise: each of the 28 regular drivers is required to have an international co-driver, who is eligible to score points in the race. An "international co-driver" is defined as a driver who is known for competing in racing series outside Australia (the driver may be Australian but primarily raced in Asia, Europe, or the Americas), as opposed to a driver who competes with a racing licence issued by a country outside Australia and New Zealand (as is the case with Alexandre Premat, a Frenchman who is contesting the series as a regular driver).

Drivers Championship

Notes:
 — Driver ineligible to score points.

Teams championship
 

Notes
† — denotes a single-car team.

Manufacturers Championship
The Manufacturers Championship was awarded to Holden.

See also
2012 V8 Supercar season

References

2012
2012 in V8 Supercars